James H. Miller may be:
James Hughes Miller (1843-1890), Illinois politician
Jim Miller (American football coach) (1920-2006)